Lakes in the Ludwigslust-Parchim district, Mecklenburg-Vorpommern, Germany are:

See also
 List of lakes in Mecklenburg-Vorpommern

References